Fain Skinner (born February 21, 1985) is an American professional stock car racing driver who last competed in what is now the NASCAR Xfinity Series part-time in 2012. He has also made starts in the NASCAR K&N Pro Series East and the ARCA Racing Series.

Racing career
Skinner began his racing career at the age of nine, competing in kart racing events; he would go on to score over one hundred wins in kart racing, and was named the 1999 National Champion of the World Karting Association, in addition to winning the Florida Karting Association championship four times.

Moving to competing in stock cars at the age of 15, Skinner established himself in late model racing; he raced in the FASCAR Sunbelt Super Series, a Florida late model racing circuit, from 2003–2005, winning the series' Rookie of the Year award in 2003.

Skinner made his debut in national NASCAR competition in 2011, competing in four races in the Nationwide Series. His debut was at the Kroger 200 at Lucas Oil Raceway at Indianapolis, competing for Rick Ware Racing, and finishing 26th; he would run three races later in the year for Go Green Racing, scoring a best finish of 23rd at Dover International Speedway in September.

In 2012, Skinner made his debut in the ARCA Racing Series, competing in the Lucas Oil Slick Mist 200 at Daytona International Speedway in the No. 39 Chevrolet owned by Mario Gosselin. Skinner ran a consistent race, but was collected in an accident on the final lap of the event, finishing 15th.

Skinner planned to compete in selected events in the NASCAR Camping World Truck Series late in the 2012 season, but his next major race in 2012 was at Bristol Motor Speedway in the Nationwide Series for Rick Ware Racing in August.

Personal and business life
Skinner, who is unrelated to 1995 NASCAR SuperTruck Series presented by Craftsman champion Mike Skinner, is a third-generation resident of Suwannee County, Florida and is a graduate of Florida Gateway College. He and his wife Hannah have two sons. Skinner helps operate the family business, Skinner's Paint and Body Shop, in Live Oak, Florida as well as a Gym; in August 2012, he and his father Ronald received one of Suwannee County's first five liquor licenses.

Motorsports career results

NASCAR
(key) (Bold – Pole position awarded by qualifying time. Italics – Pole position earned by points standings or practice time. * – Most laps led.)

Nationwide Series

K&N Pro Series East

ARCA Racing Series
(key) (Bold – Pole position awarded by qualifying time. Italics – Pole position earned by points standings or practice time. * – Most laps led.)

References

External links
 
 

Living people
1985 births
People from Live Oak, Florida
Racing drivers from Florida
NASCAR drivers
ARCA Menards Series drivers
World Karting Association drivers
Florida Gateway College alumni